Tonbridge Swimming Pool is a swimming pool in Tonbridge, Kent. It has an indoor teaching and toddler pool, plus a fitness pool joined to a heated outdoor pool or lido linked by a swim-through channel.

Description 

The four lane, heated, 20 metre open air pool has a man-made beach and a large sunbathing terrace.

There is a café and a spa, which includes a spa pool jacuzzi, sauna, steam room, aromatherapy room, sunbeds, and heated loungers.

History
The original heated outdoor pool was built in 1910. The indoor pool opened in 1996.

It is owned and operated by Tonbridge and Malling Borough Council.

References

External links
Tonbridge Swimming Pool official site
Tonbridge Swimming Club
Lidos in the UK

Lidos
1910 establishments in England
Swimming venues in England
Tonbridge